Isobel Jane Miller Percy, Duchess of Northumberland (née Richard; born 11 May 1958), is a British aristocrat and businesswoman. She has served as Lord Lieutenant of Northumberland since 2009, and is best known for redeveloping The Alnwick Garden at Alnwick Castle. She is the first woman to serve as Lord Lieutenant of Northumberland. Her husband, Ralph, is the 12th Duke of Northumberland.

Early life 
Jane Richard was born in Edinburgh in 1958. She is one of four children of the stockbroker John Richard (1933–2003), as well as sororal grandniece of Max Woosnam. Her mother, Angela, Lady Buchan-Hepburn (née Scott), is the owner of Kailzie Gardens, an income-generating family garden located in the Scottish Borders. Her parents divorced in the early 1970s and both remarried; her stepmother Christine was a Conservative group leader on the City of Edinburgh Council, while her stepfather was Sir Ninian Buchan-Hepburn, 6th Baronet (1922–1992).

As a child, Jane Richard helped her mother maintain Kailzie Gardens and aspired to become a champion figure-skater, practising for the Scottish Junior Championships at Murrayfield Ice Rink. She quit when she was 13 and was enrolled at Cobham Hall in Kent.

Marriage
At the age of 16, Jane Richard met the 17-year-old Lord Ralph Percy at his cousin's birthday party, and later followed him to Oxford, where he attended the University of Oxford, and she took a secretarial course. They married on 21 July 1979 at Traquair Parish Church, despite being deemed too young by their parents. The pair have four children:

 Lady Catherine Sarah "Katie" Percy (b. 23 June 1982), a gun-maker, motorcycle mechanic and racing driver; married Patrick Valentine on 26 February 2011. The couple had no children and separated in late 2013 before divorcing in 2014.
 George Dominic Percy, Earl Percy (b. 4 May 1984); heir apparent to the dukedom and managing director of energy company Cluff Geothermal with Paul Younger
 Lady Melissa Jane Percy (b. 20 May 1987); a fashion designer and former professional tennis player, she married Thomas van Straubenzee, an estate agent and schoolfriend of Princes William and Harry, on 22 June 2013. Straubenzee is a godfather of Princess Charlotte.  The couple had no children and divorced on 2 March 2016. Lady Melissa married for a second time on 19 December 2020 to American financier Remy W. Trafelet. The couple have one daughter together, in addition to Trafelet's three children from his previous marriage.
 Lord Max Ralph Percy (b. 26 May 1990); married Princess Nora of Oettingen-Spielberg, daughter of Prince Albrecht of Oettingen-Spielberg and Angela Jank, on 15 July 2017. at the Mariä Himmelfahrt Castle Chapel at Schloss Hirschbrunn. The couple have one daughter:
 Romy Jane Percy (born 31 July 2019, Munich)

The couple lived in a farmhouse in Northumberland until 1995, when Lady Ralph Percy's brother-in-law Henry, 11th Duke of Northumberland, died from heart failure after an overdose of amphetamines. Her husband succeeded to the dukedom; she is the first Duchess of Northumberland not to come from the titled aristocracy. As old family friends, the Duke and Duchess attended the wedding of Prince William and Catherine Middleton.

Entrepreneurship

The Duchess was unhappy in her ducal role until her husband suggested that she should renovate The Alnwick Garden, a large ornamental garden at the family seat, Alnwick Castle. She started the work on the garden in 2000, and turned it into one of North East England's biggest visitor attractions, as well as one of the country's most controversial ones. In 2003, the garden became a charitable trust separate from her husband's estate, with the Duchess as a fundraiser and one of six trustees.

A practising martial arts enthusiast, she introduced cage boxing to The Alnwick Gardens and a range of cocktails named after her. The Duchess, who claims to defy tradition, has received praise and scorn for The Alnwick Gardens, but has dismissed criticism as "the snobbery element of gardening". The locals welcomed the restoration and the influx of tourists, while English Heritage accused the Duchess of destroying one of the greatest gardens in England. In 2004, she was hospitalised after collapsing under pressure, and the criticism made her consider resigning the trusteeship and giving up on the project.

In 2012, the Duchess announced her plan to finish reconstruction of The Alnwick Garden by May 2015. She has made arrangements enabling her then to step down from managing it and for the visitor attraction to be franchised out to an external management company. She has also arranged for a series of books and titles to be brought out based on the Alnwick Castle archive covering aspects of the life and history of the Percy family estate.

Lord-lieutenancy
On 12 May 2009, having been recommended by Prime Minister Gordon Brown, she was appointed Lord Lieutenant of Northumberland by Queen Elizabeth II. The post was once held by her father-in-law Hugh, 10th Duke, and eleven other members of the Percy family, but the Duchess is the first woman to receive this distinction. She was, in 2011, patron of 160 charities.

Publications
The Poison Diaries, 
''Alnwick Castle, The Home of the Duke and Duchess of Northumberland" (2012) by James McDonald, foreword by The Duchess of Northumberland,

References

External links
Official website of The Alnwick Garden

1958 births
Businesspeople from Edinburgh
Jane
Lord-Lieutenants of Northumberland
British gardeners
British women in business
Living people
Jane
People educated at Cobham Hall School